Lohagarh Fort (or Iron Fort) is situated at Bharatpur built by Jat rulers in Rajasthan, India. The inaccessible Lohagarh fort could withstand repeated attacks of British forces led by Lord Lake during the siege of Bharatpur in 1805 when they laid siege for over six weeks yet failed in all four attempts to storm the fortress.

Of the two gates in the fort, the one in the north is known as Ashtdhaatu (eight metalled) gate while the one facing the south is called Chowburja (four-pillared) gate. Monuments in the fort include are Kishori Mahal, Mahal Khas, and Kothi Khas.

Jawahar Burj was built by Raja Jawahar Singh in 1765 to commemorate his victory over Mughals at Battle of Delhi (1764). Jawahar Burj was also used for the coronation ceremony of the rulers. Fateh Burj was built by Raja Ranjeet Singh in 1805 for the commemoration of his win over the British at the Siege of Bharatpur (1805).

These parts of the Fort are granted the status of State Protected Monuments in Rajasthan – Kamara Khas, Kishori Mahal, Hansarani Mahal, Kachahari Kala, Chaman Bagichi, Hammam & mudwall gates i.e. Mathura gate, Binarain gate, Atal Bandh gate, Anah gate, Kumher gate, Govardhan gate, Neemda gate, Chandpol gate, and bastion near Suraj pol.

Following parts of Lohagarh Fort are recognized as Monuments of National Importance in Rajasthan - Jawahar Burj, Ashtadhatu Gateway, Moat surrounding the Fort wall, Fort walls including Chowburja gate and approach bridges at the Chowburja and Ashtadhatu gates.

References

External links
 www.hindi100.com/lohagarh-fort/

Further reading 
Dr. Prakash Chandra Chandawat: Maharaja Suraj Mal aur unka yug, Jaypal Agencies Agra, 1982
Kunwar Natwar Singh: Maharaja Suraj Mal, 1707-1763 - His Life and Times, Publisher: Rupa, 2001, 
 Glimpses of Glorious Bharatpur: A Conspectus, 1945

Forts in Rajasthan
Bharatpur, Rajasthan
History of Bharatpur, Rajasthan
Tourist attractions in Bharatpur, Rajasthan